Pedro Henrique Carvalho Freitas or simply Pedro Henrique (born October 12, 1985 in Barra do Garças), is a Brazilian goalkeeper. He currently plays for Aparecidense.

Career
Plays in the Goiás. Served on the staff of Canedense, in contention for the 2007 Campeonato Goiano.

Career statistics
(Correct )

Honours
Goiás
Campeonato Goiano: 2003, 2006, 2009

Contract
 Goiás, 22 November 2004 to 15 November 2009.

References

External links
 sambafoot
 Guardian Stats Centre
 zerozero.pt
 goiasesporteclube.com

1985 births
Living people
Brazilian footballers
Goiás Esporte Clube players
Agremiação Sportiva Arapiraquense players
Associação Atlética Aparecidense players
Association football goalkeepers